The 26th Annual Grammy Awards were held on February 28, 1984, at Shrine Auditorium, Los Angeles, and were broadcast live on American television. They recognized accomplishments by musicians from the year 1983. Michael Jackson, who had been recovering from scalp burns sustained due to an accident that occurred during the filming of a Pepsi commercial, won a record eight awards during the show. It is notable for garnering the largest Grammy Award television audience ever with 51.67 million viewers.

Album of the Year and Record of the Year went to Quincy Jones and Michael Jackson for Thriller and "Beat It", and Song of the Year went to The Police for "Every Breath You Take".

Ratings
Donna Summer opened the show with "She Works Hard for the Money", and a tribute to working women.

Performers

Winners

General
 Record of the Year
 "Beat It" – Michael Jackson
 Quincy Jones (producer) & Michael Jackson (producer)
 Album of the Year
 Thriller – Michael Jackson
 Quincy Jones (producer) & Michael Jackson (producer)
 Song of the Year
 "Every Breath You Take" – The Police
 Sting (songwriter)
 Best New Artist
 Culture Club

Blues
 Best Traditional Blues Recording
 Blues 'n Jazz – B.B. King

Children's
 Best Recording for Children Presented by Latin Group Menudo.
 Quincy Jones (producer) & Michael Jackson for E.T. the Extra-Terrestrial

Classical
 Best Orchestral Recording
 James Mallinson (producer), Georg Solti (conductor) & the Chicago Symphony Orchestra for Mahler: Symphony No. 9 in D
 Best Classical Vocal Soloist Performance
 James Levine (conductor), Marilyn Horne, Leontyne Price & the Metropolitan Opera Orchestra for Leontyne Price & Marilyn Horne in Concert at the Met
 Best Opera Recording
 Christopher Raeburn (producer), Georg Solti (conductor), Thomas Allen, Kiri Te Kanawa, Kurt Moll, Lucia Popp, Samuel Ramey, Frederica von Stade & the London Philharmonic for Mozart: Le Nozze di Figaro
 Jay David Saks, Max Wilcox (producers), James Levine (conductor), Plácido Domingo, Cornell MacNeil, Teresa Stratas, & the Metropolitan Opera Orchestra for Verdi: La Traviata (Original Soundtrack)
 Best Choral Performance (other than opera)
 Georg Solti (conductor), Margaret Hillis (choir director) & the Chicago Symphony Orchestra & Chorus for Haydn: The Creation
 Best Classical Performance - Instrumental Soloist or Soloists (with orchestra)
 Raymond Leppard (conductor), Wynton Marsalis & the National Philharmonic Orchestra for Haydn: Trumpet Concerto in E Flat/L. Mozart: Trumpet Concerto In D/Hummel: Trumpet Concerto in E Flat
 Best Classical Performance - Instrumental Soloist or Soloists (without orchestra)
 Glenn Gould for Beethoven: Piano Sonatas Nos. 12 & 13
 Best Chamber Music Performance
 Mstislav Rostropovich and Rudolf Serkin for Brahms: Sonata for Cello and Piano in E Minor, Op. 38 and Sonata in F, Op. 99
 Best Classical Album
 James Mallinson (producer), Georg Solti (conductor) & the Chicago Symphony Orchestra for Mahler: Symphony No. 9 in D

Comedy
 Best Comedy Recording
 Eddie Murphy: Comedian – Eddie Murphy

Composing and arranging
 Best Instrumental Composition
 Giorgio Moroder (composer) for "Love Theme From Flashdance" performed by various artists
 Best Album of Original Score Written for a Motion Picture or A Television Special
 Michael Boddicker, Irene Cara, Kim Carnes, Douglas Cotler, Keith Forsey, Richard Gilbert,  Jerry Hey, Duane Hitchings, Craig Krampf, Ronald Magness, Dennis Matkosky, Giorgio Moroder, Phil Ramone,  Michael Sembello, Shandi Sinnamon (composers) for Flashdance performed by various artists
 Best Arrangement on an Instrumental
 Dave Grusin (arranger) for "Summer Sketches '82"
 Best Instrumental Arrangement Accompanying Vocal(s)
 Nelson Riddle (arranger) for "What's New" performed by Linda Ronstadt
 Best Vocal Arrangement for Two or More Voices
 Arif Mardin & Chaka Khan (arrangers) for "Be Bop Medley" performed by Chaka Khan

Country
 Best Country Vocal Performance, Female
 Anne Murray for "A Little Good News"
 Best Country Vocal Performance, Male
 Lee Greenwood for "I.O.U."
 Best Country Performance by a Duo or Group with Vocal
 Alabama for The Closer You Get...
 Best Country Instrumental Performance
 New South for "Fireball"
 Best Country Song
 Mike Reid (songwriter) for "Stranger in My House" performed by Ronnie Milsap

Folk
 Best Ethnic or Traditional Folk Recording
 Clifton Chenier for I'm Here performed by Clifton Chenier & His Red Hot Louisiana Band

Gospel
 Best Gospel Performance, Female
 Amy Grant for "Ageless Medley"
 Best Gospel Performance, Male
 Russ Taff for Walls of Glass
 Best Gospel Performance by a Duo or Group
 Larnelle Harris & Sandi Patti for "More Than Wonderful"
 Best Soul Gospel Performance, Female
 Sandra Crouch for We Sing Praises
 Best Soul Gospel Performance, Male
 Al Green for I'll Rise Again
 Best Soul Gospel Performance by a Duo or Group
 Barbara Mandrell & Bobby Jones for "I'm So Glad I'm Standing Here Today"
 Best Inspirational Performance
 Donna Summer for "He's a Rebel"

Historical
 Best Historical Album
 Allan Steckler & Stanley Walker (producers) for The Greatest Recordings of Arturo Toscanini - Symphonies, Vol. I

Jazz
 Best Jazz Vocal Performance, Female
 Ella Fitzgerald for The Best Is Yet to Come
 Best Jazz Vocal Performance, Male
 Mel Tormé for Top Drawer
 Best Jazz Vocal Performance, Duo or Group
 The Manhattan Transfer for "Why Not!"
 Best Jazz Instrumental Performance, Soloist
 Wynton Marsalis for Think of One
 Best Instrumental Jazz Performance, Group
 Phil Woods for At the Vanguard
 Best Instrumental Jazz Performance, Big Band
 Rob McConnell for All in Good Time
 Best Jazz Fusion Performance, Vocal or Instrumental
 Pat Metheny Group for Travels

Latin
 Best Latin Pop Performance
 Jose Feliciano for Me enamoré
 Best Tropical Latin Performance
 Tito Puente for On Broadway performed by Tito Puente & His Latin Ensemble
 Best Mexican-American Performance
 Los Lobos for "Anselma"

Musical show
 Best Cast Show Album
 Andrew Lloyd Webber (producer) & the original Broadway cast for Cats (Complete Original Broadway Cast Recording)

Music video
 Best Video, Short Form
 Girls on Film/Hungry Like the Wolf – Duran Duran
 Best Video Album
 Duran Duran – Duran Duran

Packaging and notes
 Best Album Package
 Speaking in Tongues
 Robert Rauschenberg (art director)  (Talking Heads)
 Best Album Notes
 The Interplay Sessions
 Orrin Keepnews (notes writer) (Bill Evans)

Pop
 Best Pop Vocal Performance, Female
 "Flashdance... What a Feeling" – Irene Cara
 Best Pop Vocal Performance, Male
 Thriller – Michael Jackson
 Best Pop Performance by a Duo or Group with Vocals
 "Every Breath You Take" – The Police
 Best Pop Instrumental Performance
 "Being With You" – George Benson

Production and engineering
 Best Engineered Recording, Non-Classical
 Thriller 
 Bruce Swedien (engineer) (Michael Jackson)
 Best Engineered Recording, Classical
 James Lock (engineer), Georg Solti (conductor) & the Chicago Symphony Orchestra for Mahler: Symphony No. 9 in D
 Producer of the Year (Non-Classical)
 Michael Jackson & Quincy Jones
 Classical Producer of the Year
 Marc Aubort & Joanna Nickrenz

R&B
 Best R&B Vocal Performance, Female
 Chaka Khan – Chaka Khan
 Best R&B Vocal Performance, Male
 "Billie Jean" – Michael Jackson
 Best R&B Performance by a Duo or Group with Vocal
 "Ain't Nobody" – Chaka Khan & Rufus
 Best R&B Instrumental Performance
 "Rockit" – Herbie Hancock
 Best Rhythm & Blues Song
 "Billie Jean" – Michael Jackson
 "Michael Jackson (songwriter)

Rock
 Best Rock Vocal Performance, Female
 "Love Is a Battlefield" – Pat Benatar
 Best Rock Vocal Performance, Male
 "Beat It" – Michael Jackson
 Best Rock Performance by a Duo or Group with Vocal
 Synchronicity – The Police
 Best Rock Instrumental Performance
 "Brimstone and Treacle" – Sting

Spoken
 Best Spoken Word or Non-musical Recording
 Copland: A Lincoln Portrait – William Warfield

References 

 026
1984 in California
1984 music awards
1984 in Los Angeles
Grammy
February 1984 events in the United States